Opeongo High School is a secondary school in Renfrew County, Ontario, Canada, that serves the townships of Whitewater Region, Laurentian Valley, Admaston Bromley, Sebastapol, Bonnechere Valley, and North Algona-Wilberforce.  It was built in 1968, at a cost of $3.6 million, to accommodate a growing population of students and a change in educational trends. It has a student population of between 400 and 500 students. Its colours are green and gold, and its mascot is the Wildcat.

Notable alumni

Kevin Gillis (creator of cartoon series The Raccoons)
Jesse Hutch (actor with roles in Freddy vs. Jason and in television series including American Dreams and About a Girl).
Melissa Bishop (Olympic athlete 800m track)

See also
List of high schools in Ontario

Sources
Cobden Then and Now By: George A. Wallace

External links
Opeongo High School

High schools in Renfrew County
1968 establishments in Ontario
Educational institutions established in 1968